The men's downhill competition at the 2013 World Championships was held on Saturday, February 9, with 58 athletes from 27 nations.

Aksel Lund Svindal won his second world title in downhill and fifth overall, joined on the podium by Dominik Paris and David Poisson.

Results
The race was started at 11:00.

References

External links
  
 FIS-Ski.com - AWSC 2013 - calendar & results

Men's downhill
2013